Major-General Timothy Patrick Toyne Sewell DL (born 7 July 1941) is a former British Army officer who became Commandant of the Royal Military Academy Sandhurst.

Military career
Educated at Bedford School and the Royal Military Academy Sandhurst, Toyne Sewell was commissioned into the King's Own Scottish Borderers in 1961. He was appointed Commanding Officer of 1st Bn King's Own Scottish Borderers in 1981, Chief of Staff for British Forces in the Falkland Islands 1983 and Commander 19th Infantry Brigade in 1985. He went on to be Commander of the British Military Advisory and Training Team in Zimbabwe in 1989 and Commandant of the Royal Military Academy Sandhurst in 1991 before resigning in 1994.

In retirement he became Director of Goodenough College in London and then Chairman of UWC. He is a deputy lieutenant of London.

Family
He was married in 1965; they have one son and one daughter.

References

1941 births
Living people
British Army generals
People educated at Bedford School
King's Own Scottish Borderers officers
Deputy Lieutenants of Greater London
Graduates of the Royal Military Academy Sandhurst